The Tibetan lark (Melanocorypha maxima) is a species of lark in the family Alaudidae found on the Tibetan plateau from north-western India to central China. Alternate names for this species include the Asiatic lark, long-billed calandra lark and long-billed lark.

References

External links

Images - Animal Diversity Web

Tibetan lark
Birds of Tibet
Birds of Central China
Tibetan lark
Taxonomy articles created by Polbot
Tibetan lark